Seend railway station was near the village of Seend in Wiltshire, England. The station was a stop on the Devizes Branch Line, between Semington and Bromham & Rowde. Its position northwest of the village was chosen to serve the iron ore quarry and iron works at Seend Cleeve.

After the completion of the Devizes line, the junction at Holt made the line part of the fastest route from London to the West Country. The line suffered from reduced traffic after the completion in 1900 of the Stert and Westbury Railway between Patney and Chirton station and Westbury, which by-passed the Devizes branch to shorten the London to Plymouth journey by five miles.

Seend station and the entire Devizes Branch Line were closed under the Beeching cuts. Both were destroyed in 1970.

See also 
 Devizes railway station

References

External links 
 
 

 

Disused railway stations in Wiltshire
Former Great Western Railway stations
Railway stations in Great Britain opened in 1857
Railway stations in Great Britain closed in 1966
Beeching closures in England
1857 establishments in England